Chollangi Peta is a village in East Godavari district of the Indian state of Andhra Pradesh. It is located in Thallarevu mandal.

References

Villages in East Godavari district